Woodridge High School is a public high school in Cuyahoga Falls, Ohio, United States. It is the only high school in the Woodridge Local School District. The district serves Peninsula, northern Cuyahoga Falls, most of Boston Township, and a small portion of northwest Akron.

The high school is also part of the Six District Educational Compact, a joint program of six area school districts (Cuyahoga Falls, Hudson, Kent, Stow-Munroe Falls, Tallmadge and Woodridge) to share access to each of their vocational training facilities and career resources.

Activities
The school offers many extra- and co-curricular activities for students to participate in: marching and concert band; Latin and Spanish Club; Drama Club; Literary Club; Political Awareness Club; Interact of Rotary International; Diversity Club; etc.

Administration
 Principal: Albert DiTommaso

State championships

 Boys cross country – 2006, 2007, 2008, 2009, 2010, 2012, 2016, 2018, 2019, 2020 
 Girls cross country – 1995, 2016
 Boys Track - 2021

Notable alumni
 Kevin Coughlin, former Republican state senator
 Mark Mothersbaugh, of the band Devo; film score composer for The Lego Movie
 Hunter Niswander, NFL player
 Jeff Phelps, Cleveland TV & radio personality

Athletic facilities
Lahoski Field - football and soccer 
Mercer Family Track - all-weather track
Field house 
Includes Stammen Wrestling Room, weight room, training room, 1 classroom, 2 locker rooms, and a storage area.
Baseball field
Softball field
Gymnasium
Auxiliary gymnasium

External links

Notes and references

High schools in Summit County, Ohio
Public high schools in Ohio
Cuyahoga Falls, Ohio